Goodenia forrestii  is a species of flowering plant in the family Goodeniaceae and is endemic to Western Australia. It is an ascending to low-lying herb with elliptic to lance-shaped leaves with teeth on the edges, and racemes of yellow flowers with a brownish centre.

Description

Taxonomy and naming
Goodenia forrestii was first formally described in 1892 by Ferdinand von Mueller in The Victorian Naturalist from specimens collected by Sir John Forrest.
The specific epithet (forrestii) honours Forrest.

Distribution and habitat
This goodenia grows in sandy soil in scrub and woodland in the Carnarvon, Gascoyne and Pilbara biogeographic regions in the north-west of Western Australia.

Conservation status
Goodenia forrestii is classified as "not threatened" by the Government of Western Australia Department of Parks and Wildlife.

References

forrestii
Eudicots of Western Australia
Plants described in 1892
Taxa named by Ferdinand von Mueller
Endemic flora of Western Australia